

Beonna (or Benna; died  828) was a medieval Bishop of Hereford. He was consecrated in 824 and died between 825 and 832.

Citations

References

External links
 

Bishops of Hereford
9th-century deaths
9th-century English bishops
Year of birth unknown